Maureen Fleming is an American dancer, performance artist, and choreographer from New York City. She studied butoh dance in Japan and is known for her meditative, dreamlike  solo dances. The New Yorker magazine has called her "perhaps the foremost American practitioner of Butoh."

She directs Maureen Fleming Company, an interdisciplinary performance ensemble, creating evening length works including 'Eros'(with Yoshito Ohno)(1991), 'After Eros'(1996), 'Decay of the Angel' (2004), 'Waters of Immortality' (2007) and 'B. Madonna' (2013). Maureen Fleming began creating photography installations in conjunction with her live performances in NYC in 2009. She is known for her original form of visual theater.

Early life
She was born in Japan and grew up in Yokohama, the daughter of parents in the United States Navy. She was injured in an automobile accident at the age of two, following which she lost the disc between her fourth and fifth vertebrae. Only learning of this accident many years later, she believes this experience to have shaped her career in dance, particularly her affinity for moving her body in a slow, deliberate fashion. She moved with her parents to the United States when she was three years old, and began dancing at approximately age seven.

Dance studies and first exposure to butoh
Fleming studied ballet with Cecchetti method master Margaret Craske (1892–1990), and performed briefly with several New York City-based dance companies. She was first exposed to butoh in 1984 when she met butoh dancer Min Tanaka in New York City, joining his company, Maijuku, for a time. Following this, she studied butoh in Japan with Tanaka, and later with one of the art form's founders, Kazuo Ohno, with whom she remains in contact.

Artistic outlook and process of creation
Fleming has stated that she attempts to create archetypes in her dances, and believes the female nude to be a universal artistic image. She has stated that "the flesh is the costume of the soul."

About her work, she has said the following:

She has stated that it often takes her ten years to create a new dance.

Works and performances
Fleming has performed in North America, South America, Europe, Africa and Asia, and collaborated in her multimedia works with playwright David Henry Hwang, composer Philip Glass, photographer Lois Greenfield, ikebana artist Gaho Taniguchi and the eclectic artist Christopher Odo. She has toured with Min Tanaka and pianists Peter Phillips  and Bruce Brubaker.
She has also performed with the dancer Jean Erdman, and knew her husband, Joseph Campbell.

Directed by Fleming, Maureen Fleming Company has collaborated in the original and touring presentations: 'AFTER EROS'
(1996), 'DECAY OF THE ANGEL' (2004) and 'WATERS OF IMMORTALITY' (2007) and 'B. MADONNA'
(2013). Crossing cultures and art forms, spanning five continents, Maureen Fleming depicts images that ask what is
universal about the journey of the soul and being human. The company has received national and
international acclaim in the La Mama's 2013 premiere of B. MADONNA in NYC; the National Performance Network Performing
Americas 2012 tour to Colombia's International Festival of Manizales 2007, 2009, 2012, Argentina's
Teatro REAL 2012, Uruguay's Teatro Verdi 2012; Italy's Spoleto Festival 2011, Cleveland Museum of Art
VIVA! 1998, 2009, 2011; Cincinnati's Contemporary Dance Theater 2007, 2009, 2011; Korea's Seoul 
Performing Arts Festival 2004, 2007; Kaatsbaan International Dance Center 2004, 2007; Boston's Cutler
Majestic Theater 2001, 2004, ICA 2007, 2017; Brazil's FILO 2005, 2014 and Mercado Cultural 2011, 2005, 2009;
Jacob's Pillow Festival 2008; Fall for Dance Festival at City Center 2006; among others.

Teaching
She has taught at the Juilliard School and the New York University Tisch School of the Arts.

Awards

National Endowment for the Arts (1993-1995, 2001, 2004, 2013, 2015), New England
Foundation for the Arts National Dance Project (1997-1999), Rockefeller MAP Fund (1997, 1998),
New York Foundation for the Arts (1990, 1997) National Performance Network: Performing Americas Project (2003, 2012), 
Meet the Composer Choreographer Project (1992), the Asian Cultural Council (1990, 2004, 2006), NEA Japan US Friendship Commission (2001), Japan Foundation Performing Arts Japan (2002, 2004, 2007). Arts International
(1993- 2003), USArtists International 2009, 2016. Maureen Fleming was a Fulbright Scholar in Ireland 2016 - 2017 at the Irish World Academy at the University of Limerick and the National University of Ireland in Galway.

References

External links
Maureen Fleming official site

American female dancers
American choreographers
American performance artists
1950s births
Year of birth missing (living people)
Juilliard School faculty
Tisch School of the Arts faculty
Artists from New York City
Living people